The Diploma in Engineering or Diploma in Technical Education or Technical Diploma is a program focused on practical and skills-oriented training. It is a technical course that only covers the essentials when ranked with an undergraduate engineering degree. It aims to provide students with industry or job related basic engineering knowledge, scientific skills, computing and analysis, mathematical techniques, a sound knowledge of English to communicate in the field and ability to apply problem-solving techniques.

Its duration is minimum 3 years. Many countries in the world recognize it as equivalent to pre-engineering or bridging course when considered for continuing studies in engineering related bachelors or associate degree programs. After successful completion of diploma in engineering course, students can either continue further engineering studies in undergraduate level or get employment as technicians, technologists, supervisors, superintendents, foremen, machinist, workshop technicians, draftsman, station technicians (energy, thermal, aeronautical), automobile technicians, maintenance and service technicians, equipment mechanics and technicians, CAD/CAM programmer, agricultural overseers, instrument technicians, junior instructors, manufacturing, tool and die designers, electricians.

In some countries, one can apply for this diploma after completion of 10th grade (Secondary School Certificate).

Disciplines
Diploma in engineering can be obtained in many disciplines such as:

 Aeronautical engineering
 Architecture/Architectural engineering
 Automobile/Automotive engineering
 Ceramic Engineering
 Civil engineering
 Chemical engineering
 Computer engineering/Computer Science and engineering
 Environmental engineering
 Electrical engineering
 Electronics engineering
 Telecommunication/Communication engineering
 Electrical and Electronics Engineering
 Electronics and Telecommunication/Communication engineering
 Food technology/engineering
 Glass Engineering
 Refrigeration and Air-Conditioning engineering
 Information technology/engineering
 Instrumentation and Control engineering
 Mechanical engineering
 Mining/Mining and Mine Survey Engineering
 Industrial and Production engineering
 Marine engineering
 Materials engineering
 Mechatronics engineering
 Manufacturing engineering
 Petroleum engineering
 Polymer engineering
 Plastic technology/engineering
 Printing technology/engineering
 Software engineering
 Rubber technology/engineering
 Textile engineering
 Tool and Die engineering

Bangladesh

In Bangladesh, the diploma in engineering is a technical certificate awarded by the Bangladesh Technical Education Board and offered by polytechnic institutes. Students can get admitted to diploma in engineering course after completion of their secondary school level. It is a 4-year program with three and a half-year study and six months mandatory internship. Diploma is awarded in a specific branch of engineering. Curriculum includes basic knowledge of engineering, science and practical sessions for skill development.

Diploma in engineering certificate is equivalent to Higher Secondary Certificate (H.S.C) and the diploma holders can get admitted to Bachelor courses in specific private universities in Bangladesh. They can also get opportunities in a few public universities like Dhaka University of Engineering & Technology, Jashore University of Science and TecInstitution of Engineers, the professional body of engineers in Bangladesh after successfully passing two parts of the Associate Membership of Institution of Engineers (AMIE) exam.

India
See also : Industrial training institute

In India, the diploma in engineering is a 3-year course awarded in a specific branch of engineering e.g. chemical engineering, mechanical engineering, civil engineering, electrical engineering, etc.. It is usually offered in polytechnic institutes recognized by the respective State Boards of Technical Education (e.g. Uttar Pradesh Board of Technical Education) and recognised by the State Departments/Directorates of Technical Educations and All India Council for Technical Education.

Diploma holders are often called junior engineers in India. They can sit for the examination of Associate Member of the Institution of Engineers (AMIE) membership and become member of the Indian Institution of Industrial Engineering (IIIE). Diploma holders can enroll for advanced diploma programs in concentrated job sectors within their area of study. Diploma holders are also eligible for lateral entry to the third semester engineering courses i.e. direct entry to second year. Diploma holders are eligible for part-time entry to Bachelor of Engineering/Bachelor of Technology courses in various technical universities. In Tamil Nadu, the government is revolutionizing its technical education by upgrading its diploma courses with newer schemes (L Scheme and forward) to make it equivalent with UK's HND programs that enables students for direct entry into the fifth semester (third year) of a BE/B.Tech of engineering program. Those who have a twelfth grade (Higher Secondary School Certificate) in Physics, Chemistry and Mathematics (PCM) combination, require only to complete two years excluding first year physics, chemistry, mathematics inter science level subjects.

Pakistan
See also : Diploma of Associate Engineering

In Pakistan, the diploma in engineering is a 3-year program awarded by the respective Provincial Boards of Technical Education and offered by the polytechnic institutions. It is equivalent to HSSC (Pre-Engineering) by the Inter Board Committee of Chairmen (IBCC). A candidate having Secondary School Certificate (SSC) or Technical School Certificate (TSC) can enroll in this program. Diploma is offered in various engineering disciplines such as electrical, electronics, computer, telecommunication, mechanical, civil, chemical etc.

Diploma holders are often called associate engineers or sub engineers in Pakistan. They can either get employment or enroll in Bachelor of Technology and Bachelor of Engineering degree programs for higher study.

See also 
 Engineering technologist
 Engineering technician
 Mechanic
 Electrician

References

Engineering education
Vocational education